Héctor Cabrera Llácer (born 9 March 1994), also known as Héctor Cabrera, is a Spanish Paralympic athlete who competes in mainly javelin throw and shot put and occasionally discus throw at international elite events. He is a double World medalist and a double European champion. He took part in the 2016 Summer Paralympics in the javelin throw and shot put but did not medal in either event.

In 2019, he won the silver medal in the javelin throw at the 2019 World Para Athletics Championships and qualified to compete at the 2020 Summer Paralympics.

Notes

References

External links
 
 

1994 births
Living people
Sportspeople from Valencia
Paralympic athletes of Spain
Spanish male discus throwers
Spanish male javelin throwers
Spanish male shot putters
Athletes (track and field) at the 2016 Summer Paralympics
Athletes (track and field) at the 2020 Summer Paralympics
Medalists at the World Para Athletics Championships
Medalists at the World Para Athletics European Championships
Medalists at the 2020 Summer Paralympics
Paralympic bronze medalists for Spain
Paralympic medalists in athletics (track and field)
Visually impaired discus throwers
Visually impaired javelin throwers
Visually impaired shot putters
Paralympic discus throwers
Paralympic shot putters
Paralympic javelin throwers